Alexander Montgomery Thackara (1848–1937), addressed as "Mont" in family correspondence, was born in Philadelphia in 1848. He graduated from the United States Naval Academy at Annapolis in 1869. He served in the Navy for twenty-three years in European and the Far East.

He met Eleanor Sherman, the daughter of William Tecumseh Sherman (Commanding General of the United States Army from 1869–1883), in 1879.  They were married on May 5, 1880, at General Sherman's home in Washington D. C. The couple had four children: Alexander Montgomery ("Lex"), William Tecumseh Sherman ("Sherman"), Elizabeth, and Eleanor.

Thackara left the service in 1881 to enter his father's business in Philadelphia. He "was appointed by President William McKinley to serve as a U.S. Consul at Le Havre, France in 1897. He also served as Consul General in Berlin from 1905 to 1913, and President Woodrow Wilson appointed him to be Consul General in Paris in 1913,"  where he served until 1924.  Eleanor played a leading role in the Red Cross in Paris during the First World War. She died in Paris in 1915 and Alexander M. Thackara died in 1937 from bronchial pneumonia in the American Hospital of Paris, located in Neuilly-sur-Seine, France, where he had lived for several years after his retirement.

Many pieces of correspondence between A. M. Thackara and family are housed in the Special Collections of Falvey Memorial Library at Villanova University as part of the Sherman-Thackara Collection.

Notes

External links

 Sherman-Thackara Collection at Villanova University

1848 births
1937 deaths
United States Naval Academy alumni
United States Army officers
Military personnel from Philadelphia
American diplomats
Deaths from pneumonia in France